Disappearing may refer to:

"Disappearing" (The Sinceros song), from the 1981 album Pet Rock
"Disappearing", a 2013 song by musician Dan Wilson
"Disappearing", a 2017 episode of the Korean series My Only Love Song

See also
Disappear (disambiguation)
Disappearance (disambiguation)
Disappeared (disambiguation)